The All-Ireland Under-14 Ladies' Football Championship is a "knockout" competition in the game of Ladies' Gaelic football played by women in Ireland. The series of games are organised by the Ladies' Gaelic Football Association (Irish: Cumann Peil Gael na mBan) and are played during the summer months. All players have to be under 14 years of age.

Top winners

Roll of honour

Under-14 B Championship

References

Outside Sources
 Ladies Gaelic Roll of Honour

Under-14 Ladies' Football Championship
Ladies' Gaelic football competitions